Poplar Hill is a historic home located near Smithfield, Isle of Wight County, Virginia. The house was built about 1793, and is a -story, frame, hall and parlor-plan dwelling. It has an early 19th-century lean-to rear addition, a post American Civil War kitchen addition, a 1920s one-room addition, and a screened-in front porch on the main facade.  Also on the property are the contributing wash house, shed, garage, and stable, and the sites of a smokehouse, kitchen, carriage house, and ice house.

It was listed on the National Register of Historic Places in 1995.

References

Houses on the National Register of Historic Places in Virginia
Georgian architecture in Virginia
Houses completed in 1793
Houses in Isle of Wight County, Virginia
National Register of Historic Places in Isle of Wight County, Virginia